Howe & Howe Tech, also called Black Ops Brothers by Authentic Entertainment Inc., is a reality television series produced by Authentic Entertainment for the Discovery Channel. It documents the day-to-day activities of identical twin brothers Michael "Mike" and Geoffrey "Geoff" Howe, who operate a small business out of Waterboro, Maine called Howe & Howe Technologies. The first season aired from January 5 to February 9, 2010, while the second season, having the title Black Ops Brothers: Howe & Howe Tech, had its run from December 13 in the same year up to February 2, 2011. The show's title is shorthand for the company name.

Howe & Howe Technologies specializes in fabrication and design of armored and military-grade vehicles, some even ordered by the US military. Their products include the Badger, recognized as the world's smallest armored assault vehicle by Guinness World Records; the SR1, or Subterranean Rover 1; and the Ripsaw, touted as the world's fastest dual tracked vehicle. Mike is the president of the company and chief engineer while Geoff is the CEO and company manager. Aside from a ten-man crew who help build the concept vehicles conceptualized by the brothers, the show also features the twins' wives, Tammy and Tracy, themselves sisters who each serve as a secretary for each other twin.

Episodes 
Source:

Season 1 (2010)

Season 2 (2010–2011)

References

External links
Howe & Howe Technologies official website
Authentic Entertainment page
Howe & Howe Tech show website at Discovery.com

2010 American television series debuts
2011 American television series endings
2010s American reality television series
Vehicle modification media
Discovery Channel original programming
Television series by Authentic Entertainment